The 2004–05 Cymru Alliance was the fifteenth season of the Cymru Alliance after its establishment in 1990. The league was won by Buckley Town.

League table

External links
Cymru Alliance

Cymru Alliance seasons
2
Wales